Huey Long  is a 1941 bronze sculpture of Huey Long by Charles Keck, installed in the United States Capitol, in Washington, D.C., as part of the National Statuary Hall Collection. It is one of two statues donated by the state of Louisiana.

The statue was accepted in the collection by Senator Allen Ellender on April 25, 1941.  At that time Ellender said, “He was a doer of things for the benefit of the masses; and his philosophy of distribution of wealth, his advocacy of pensions for the aged, shorter work hours for labor and his continued fight for the masses ….. marked him for death.”

Long, a popular populist nicknamed “The Kingfish” was first Governor and then Senator from Louisiana and was assassinated in Baton Rouge on Tuesday, September 10, 1935.

A very similar statue, without the raised right arm, of Long by Keck was unveiled in 1940 on the grounds of the Louisiana State Capitol.

See also
 1941 in art

References

External links
 

1941 establishments in Washington, D.C.
1941 sculptures
Bronze sculptures in Washington, D.C.
Huey Long
Monuments and memorials in Washington, D.C.
Long, Huey
Sculptures of men in Washington, D.C.
Sculptures by Charles Keck